The 7th Infantry Division (7-ya Pekhotnaya Diviziya) was an infantry formation of the Russian Imperial Army that existed in various formations from the early 19th century until the end of World War I and the Russian Revolution. The division was based in Radom and later Voronezh in the years leading up to 1914. It fought in World War I and was demobilized in 1918.

Organization 
Russian infantry divisions consisted of a staff, two infantry brigades, and one artillery brigade. The 7th Infantry Division was part of the 5th Army Corps.
 1st Brigade (HQ Voronezh):
 25th Smolensk Infantry Regiment
 26th Mogilev Infantry Regiment
 2nd Brigade (HQ Tambov):
 27th Vitebsk Infantry Regiment
 28th Polotsk Infantry Regiment
 7th Artillery Brigade

Chiefs of Staff
 1878-1885: Waldemar Schauman
 1897-1899: Vladislav Klembovsky
 1905: Nikolai Kalachyov
 1909: Vladimir Zheltyshev
 1912-1914: Józef Dowbor-Muśnicki
 January 15-26, 1917: Alexander Andreyevich Svechin

References 

Infantry divisions of the Russian Empire
Military units and formations disestablished in 1918
Voronezh Governorate